Jeff Davis County Courthouse may refer to:

Jeff Davis County Courthouse (Georgia), Hazlehurst, Georgia
Jeff Davis County Courthouse (Texas), Fort Davis, Texas

See also
Jefferson Davis County Courthouse, Prentiss, Mississippi